Tourettes: I Swear I Can't Help It is a QED documentary made by the BBC in 2009.

Overview
The film follows John Davidson, who has Tourette syndrome, and the changes in his life since the 1989 QED documentary John's Not Mad. Another individual with Tourette syndrome, Greg, was filmed by his mother; his tics occasionally make him collapse or appear frozen. In this film, the pair meet and see how each copes with the condition.

References

External links
 Tourettes: I Swear I Can't Help It at bbc.co.uk
 

Films about Tourette syndrome
Documentary films about mental health
British television documentaries
2009 television specials